Levinthal is a surname. It may refer to:
 Bernard L. Levinthal (1864–1953), a prominent Philadelphia rabbi
 Cyrus Levinthal (1922–1990), American molecular biologist
 David Levinthal (born 1949), American photographer
 Helen Levinthal (1910–1989), the first American woman to complete the entire course of study in a rabbinical school